Lake Evans is a manmade recreational lake in Kern County, California. It is the smaller of two lakes in the Buena Vista Aquatic Recreation Area southwest of Bakersfield. It has two boat ramps. The lake is located on the lakebed of the former Buena Vista Lake.

See also
Lake Webb
List of lakes in California

References

External links
Buena Vista Aquatic Recreational Area

Evans, Lake
Evans, Lake
Evans